Sankt Nikolai ob Draßling is a former municipality in the district of Leibnitz in Styria, Austria. Since the 2015 Styria municipal structural reform, it is part of the municipality Sankt Veit in der Südsteiermark.

References

Cities and towns in Leibnitz District